The 1875 Birthday Honours were appointments by Queen Victoria to various orders and honours to reward and highlight good works by citizens of the British Empire. The appointments were made to celebrate the official birthday of the Queen, and were published in The London Gazette in May and June 1875.

The recipients of honours are displayed here as they were styled before their new honour, and arranged by honour, with classes (Knight, Knight Grand Cross, etc.) and then divisions (Military, Civil, etc.) as appropriate.

United Kingdom and British Empire

Baron
Cospatrick Alexander, Earl of Home, by the name, style, and title of Baron Douglas, of Douglas, in the county of Lanark
George, Earl of Dalhousie  Vice-Admiral on the Retired List of Her Majesty's Fleet, by the name, style, and title of Baron Ramsay, of Glenmark, in the county of Forfar
Arthur Edward Holland Grey Egerton, commonly called Viscount Grey de Wilton, by the name, style, and title of Baron Grey de Radcliffe, in the county palatine of Lancaster

The Most Honourable Order of the Bath

Knight Grand Cross of the Order of the Bath (GCB)

Military Division
Royal Navy
Vice-Admiral Sir Hastings Reginald Yelverton 

Army
General Sir Thomas Reed 
General Henry, Lord Rokeby 
General Sir John Bloomfield Gough 
General Sir Charles Thomas Van Straubenzee
Lieutenant-General the Honourable Sir Augustus Almeric Spencer 
Lieutenant-General Sir Charles Shepherd Stuart 
Lieutenant-General Sir John Garvock 
Lieutenant-General Sir Neville Bowles Chamberlain 
Major-General Sir Alfred Hastings Horsford

Knight Commander of the Order of the Bath (KCB)

Military Division
Royal Navy
Vice-Admiral Richard Collinson 
Vice-Admiral Claude Henry Mason Buckle 
Vice-Admiral George Giffard 
Vice-Admiral William Loring 
Vice-Admiral Edward Southwell Sotheby 

Army
Lieutenant-General Burke Cuppage
Lieutenant-General the Honourable George Cadogan 
Lieutenant-General Sir Francis Seymour 
Lieutenant-General William O'Grady Haly 
Lieutenant-General Edward Alan Holdich 
Major-General Edwin Beaumont Johnson 
Major-General Henry Daly 
Surgeon-General John Campbell Brown  Bengal Army

Companion of the Order of the Bath (CB)

Military Division
Royal Navy
Vice-Admiral Thomas Henry Mason
Captain Samuel Hoskins Derriman
Captain the Honourable Henry Carr Glyn
Captain George Fiott Day 
Captain Richard Vesey Hamilton
Captain Radulphus Bryce Oldfield
Captain Charles Murray-Aynsley
Captain John Eglinton Montgomerie
Captain Henry James Raby 
Captain William Charles Fahie Wilson
Captain John Halliday Care
Captain James Graham Goodenough
Captain Nowell Salmon 
Captain Frederick William Gough
Captain Henry Duncan Grant

Army
Lieutenant-General William Raikes Faber, 17th Regiment
Lieutenant-General David Pott, Bengal Staff Corps
Major-General Charles Lennox Brownlow Maitland
Major-General William Charles Forrest
Major-General Richard Hamilton, Madras Staff Corps
Colonel James Conolly
Colonel George Bryan Milman, late 5th Regiment
Colonel Henry Le Geyt Bruce, Royal (late Bengal) Artillery
Colonel Henry Hastings Affleck Wood, Bombay Staff Corps
Colonel Francis Adam Ellis Loch, Bombay Staff Corps
Colonel Henry Knightley Burne, Bengal Staff Corps
Colonel Charles Terrington Aitchison, Bombay Staff Corps
Colonel Mark Walker  45th Regiment
Colonel Philip Gossett Piara, Royal Artillery
Colonel Alexander Abercrombie Nelson, late Depot Battalion
Colonel Patrick Robertson-Ross, late Depot Battalion
Colonel Henry Lowther Chermside, Royal Artillery
Colonel Hugh Rowlands  34th Regiment
Colonel Frederick Ernest Appleyard, 85th Regiment
Colonel Thomas Maunsell, Brigade Depot
Colonel Francis Fisher Hamilton, 4th Regiment
Colonel the Honourable Ivo de Vesci Twisleton-Wykeham-Fiennes, late 9th Lancers
Lieutenant-Colonel Charles Henry Ingilby, Royal Artillery
Lieutenant-Colonel Joseph Jordan, 41st Regiment
Lieutenant-Colonel Philip Ravenhill, Royal Engineers
Lieutenant-Colonel Charles John Stanley Gough  Bengal Cavalry
Lieutenant-Colonel George Hutchinson  Bengal Staff Corps
Lieutenant-Colonel Harry North Dalrymple Prendergast  Royal (late Madras) Engineers
Lieutenant-Colonel Henry Edward Hillman Burnside, late 88th Regiment
Lieutenant-Colonel George Murray Miller, 79th Regiment
Lieutenant-Colonel Frederick George Pym, Royal Marine Light Infantry

The Most Distinguished Order of Saint Michael and Saint George

Knight Commander of the Order of St Michael and St George (KCMG)
Francis Fortescue Turville 
The Honourable Viscount Kirkwall 
Charles Sladen 
Julius Vogel

Companion of the Order of St Michael and St George (CMG)
Sir Henry Thurstan Holland  formerly Legal Adviser, and subsequently Assistant Under-Secretary of State for the Colonies
Captain George Cumine Strahan  Governor and Commander-in-Chief of the Gold Coast Colony
Captain James Graham Goodenough , Commodore Commanding Her Majesty's Naval Forces on the Australian Station, lately employed as Commissioner to inquire into the offer of the cession of the Fiji Islands
Edgar Leopold Layard, Consul for Her Majesty at the Fiji Islands, lately employed as Commissioner to inquire into the offer of the cession of those Islands, and now acting as Administrator of the Government of the Colony of Fiji
William Charles Sargeaunt, Crown Agent for the Colonies
Colonel John Dyde, late Colonel-Commandant of Militia in the District of Montreal, in the Dominion of Canada
Colonel John Sewell, late Colonel-Commandant of the District of Quebec, in the Dominion of Canada

References

Birthday Honours
1875 awards
1875 in the United Kingdom